Björn Dunkerbeck (born 16 July 1969) is a professional windsurfer who has won the Professional Windsurfers Association (PWA) Overall World Championships a record 42 times.

Dunkerbeck is the son of a Dutch father and a Danish mother, but sailed under the Spanish flag number ESP-11, as he grew up in the volcanic archipelago of Canary Islands in Spain. He dominated the late 1980s and the entire 1990s professional scene, especially in racing, but was also a champion in wavesailing.

Both he and his sister Britt have held records for the World Sailing Speed Record Council Nautical Mile. In the 2021 Lüderitz Speed Challenge in Namibia he reached a top speed of 55.97 knots.

PWA titles
  Overall World Champion (1988–1999)
  Race World Champion (1988–1999) and 2011
  Wave World Champion (1990, 1992, 1993, 1994, 1995, 1999, 2001)
  Freestyle World Champion (1998)
  Speed World Champion (1994)

References

External links

 
 Björn Dunkerbeck at the Professional Windsurfers Association
 

1969 births
Living people
Dutch windsurfers
Dutch people of Danish descent